Night of the Living Dead: Resurrection is a 2012 film directed by James Plumb, based on George A. Romero's classic Night of the Living Dead.

Plot 
The deceased have risen with the instinct to feed on the living as a family is trapped during a zombie apocalypse. Soldiers put the sole female survivor in a "rape van" as the story concludes.

Cast 
 Sule Rimi as Ben
 Kathy Saxondale as Karen Cooper
 Lee Bane as Kevin
 Mel Stevens as Mandy
 Richard Goss as Red
 Sabrina Dickens as Bonnie
 Sarah Louise Madison as Eve
 S.J. Evans as Rhodes

Critical reception
PopMatters called the film "plodding, familiar, and tedious." DVD Talk gave it one star and simply said "Skip It."

References

External links 
 

2012 films
British zombie films
Living Dead films
2012 horror films
2010s English-language films
2010s American films
2010s British films